Bruce Bailey may refer to:

 Bruce A. Bailey (born 1937), English architectural historian, archivist and librarian
 Bruce M. Bailey (born 1935), American author and humourist